Fortune is the debut album of Callers, centered on Sara Lucas' vocals and Ryan Seaton's guitar playing. Sparely instrumented yet atmospheric, it combines elements of folk, blues, and jazz.

Reception 

The album received positive reviews, with critics highlighting Sara Lucas' voice.

Track listing
"Valerie" – 1:32
"More Than Right " – 3:24
"Rone" – 4:40
"Fortune" – 3:13
"O Family" – 3:11
"Meet Between" – 3:15 (lyrics: Mike Taylor)
"Debris" – 3:42
"In Blighted Gold" – 1:28
"The Upper Lands" – 4:12
"Tied About" – 2:58
"Ste. Genevieve" – 2:35

Personnel
 Sara Lucas – vocals, guitar
 Ryan Seaton – guitars, vocals, saxophone
 Gus Martin – drums, double base (tracks 2, 6, 7, 10)
 Don Goodwin – drums, tenor horn, trombone, tuba (tracks 4, 5, 9, 11)

References

2008 albums
Callers albums
Western Vinyl albums